William Joseph Rigney (January 29, 1918 – February 20, 2001) was an  American infielder and manager in Major League Baseball. The Bay Area native began his managerial career with the Giants (–) as the team's last manager in New York City and its first in San Francisco.

New York Giants' infielder
He began his professional baseball career in 1938 when he signed with the unaffiliated Oakland Oaks of the top-level Pacific Coast League. After seasoning in the Class B Western International League, Rigney played the full seasons of 1941 and 1942 with the Oaks, then performed World War II service in the United States Coast Guard from 1943–1945.

His most productive season came in 1947, when he reached career highs in home runs (17), runs batted in (59), runs (84), hits (142), doubles (24) and games played (130). In 1948, he was selected to the National League All-Star team; in the 1948 midsummer classic, on July 13 at Sportsman's Park, St. Louis, he drew a base on balls off Joe Coleman in his only plate appearance.

On August 12, 1950, Rigney replaced Eddie Stanky at second base after Stanky had been ejected from a game against the Phillies for repeatedly waving his arms while Andy Seminick was batting. Seminick was still irritated, and after he reached base on an error in the fourth inning, he slid hard into second base, crashing into Rigney and causing him to fall over. A nearly ten-minute brawl erupted between the teams, which required police intervention and resulted in the ejection of Seminick and Rigney from the game. The Phillies went on to win 4–3.

As a utility infielder, Rigney was a member of the  NL champion Giants, and he appeared in four games of the 1951 World Series, collecting one hit in four at bats (a single off Vic Raschi), with one run batted in, as a pinch hitter.

As a big-leaguer, Rigney was a .259 career batsman with 510 hits, 41 home runs and 212 runs batted in over 654 games.

Manager of three MLB clubs

Giants
Following his MLB playing career, Rigney was named manager of the Giants' top farm club, the Triple-A Minneapolis Millers, in 1954–1955. He led the Millers to two playoff appearances, a 170–135 overall record, and the 1955 Association and Junior World Series championships. Despite the presence of Hall of Fame center fielder Willie Mays, the Giants' final two seasons in Upper Manhattan, 1956 and 1957, were dismal: they lost 87 and 85 games, respectively, finished in sixth place in the eight-team National League both years (a combined 52 games out of first place), and their attendance fell below 700,000.

The 1960 Giants moved into new Candlestick Park and were expected to again contend for the league title. They got off the mark quickly, winning 20 of their first 29 games. But then they stumbled, losing 16 of their next 29, and were coming off a three-game series sweep at home by the eventual world champion Pittsburgh Pirates when, on June 17, Rigney was fired. At 33–25, his club was in second place, four games behind Pittsburgh, when Rigney was dismissed. Tom Sheehan, the veteran scout who replaced Rigney, fared even more poorly, however, going only 46–50 as the Giants plummeted into fifth place by season's end.

Angels

Rigney was not unemployed for long. Gene Autry and Robert O. Reynolds, the Angels' owners, originally wanted to hire future Baseball Hall of Fame manager Casey Stengel, a resident of nearby Glendale who had been fired by the New York Yankees after the 1960 World Series. But Stengel declined all managerial offers and spent 1961 in temporary retirement. Then Durocher, out of uniform since leaving the Giants in 1955 and working as a broadcaster, campaigned for the Angel job. Like Stengel, he had become a permanent resident of Southern California—he lived in Palm Springs—and was a future Hall of Fame pilot. But Autry and Reynolds bypassed him and chose Rigney instead, believing that he would have the patience to develop an expansion team's younger players.

While the Angels' maiden edition lost 91 games and finished eighth in the ten-team AL, the  team, paced by young pitchers Dean Chance and Bo Belinsky, stunned baseball by finishing in third place with an 86–76 record during their second season of existence. As a result, Rigney was named  Manager of the Year by The Sporting News.

But , Rigney's ninth season, proved catastrophic. The Angels started the year 11–28 and were mired in a ten-game losing streak when Rigney was fired on May 27 and succeeded by Lefty Phillips. Later in 1969, Rigney joined the San Francisco Giants' radio broadcast team to close out the season; coincidentally, KSFO, the Giants flagship station, was then owned by Autry and Reynolds.

Twins
When the Twins began 1972 with a 36–34 record and 9 games behind the eventual World Series champion Oakland Athletics in third place, Rigney was replaced by Frank Quilici on July 6. Team owner Calvin Griffith's explanation for the move was that he felt many of the Twins players "were too nonchalant."

Second turn with Giants
After serving as a scout for the San Diego Padres and California Angels (1973–1974), Rigney had a second managerial stint with the Giants in 1976, a year of transition between the Horace Stoneham and Bob Lurie ownerships.  Rigney's 1976 club went only 74–88 and finished 28 games behind the world champion Cincinnati Reds. Joe Altobelli succeeded him at the Giants' helm on October 7, 1976. Rigney finished with a managerial record of 1,239 wins and 1,321 losses.

Managerial record

Broadcaster, scout and "ambassador"

In an 18-season managerial career, Rigney posted a 1,239–1,321 record (.484) in 2,561 games. The Twins' three-and-out loss in the 1970 ALCS was his only MLB postseason managing appearance. As a minor league pilot, Rigney won the 1955 American Association championship at the helm of the Minneapolis Millers.

After leaving the Giants at the close of his second managerial term in 1976, he served as a front-office consultant and a radio and television broadcaster for the Oakland Athletics in the 1980s.

Rigney died in Walnut Creek, California, at age of 83.

The "Bill Rigney Good Guy Award" is given each year to a San Francisco Giant and Oakland Athletic who is most accommodating to the media.

Quotation
Rigney took the reins of the Giants in 1956, succeeding Leo Durocher, for whom he had played from 1948 to 1953. "I learned a lot from Leo Durocher", he said. "I learned about the hit-and-run, about gambling and going against the percentages. You can't play it the same all the time." – Norman L. Macht, at Baseball Library

See also

 List of Major League Baseball managers by wins

References

External links

1918 births
2001 deaths
Baseball players from California
Bellingham Chinooks players
California Angels managers
California Angels scouts
Los Angeles Angels managers
Major League Baseball broadcasters
Major League Baseball second basemen
Major League Baseball shortstops
Major League Baseball third basemen
Minneapolis Millers (baseball) managers
Minneapolis Millers (baseball) players
Minnesota Twins managers
National League All-Stars
New York Giants (NL) managers
New York Giants (NL) players
Oakland Athletics announcers
Oakland Oaks (baseball) players
Sportspeople from Alameda, California
San Diego Padres scouts
San Francisco Giants announcers
San Francisco Giants managers
Spokane Hawks players
Topeka Owls players
United States Coast Guard personnel of World War II
Vancouver Capilanos players